Crystle may refer to:

Given name 
 Crystle Lightning (born 1981), Canadian-American actress and musician
 Crystle Stewart (born 1981), American actress, television host, model and beauty pageant titleholder

Surname 
 Charlie Crystle, American entrepreneur and philanthropist